Ok Ja-yeon (born December 19, 1988) is a South Korean actress.

Early life 
Ok was born and raised in Suncheon by school teacher parents. 

Ok described herself as not studious in her younger years, but due to the influence of her friend in middle school, she started taking her studies seriously. She then excelled in academics all throughout middle school and high school. She was also a member of the theater club in middle school, but had no desire of becoming an actress during that time.

Ok initially wanted to become a lawyer and planned to study law for her undergraduate degree, but her grades did not meet the admission requirement of Seoul National University for the said degree. Due to her interest in the arts, she then decided to major in aesthetics and planned to pursue law later. 

In her third year of university, Ok watched the play Snow In March and was moved by the performance of actor Jang Min-ho. She cited it as the reason why her love for theater and acting grew and her dream of becoming an actress was born.

Career 
Ok decided to change careers and pursued acting at 25 years old (in Korean age). She made her acting debut in the theater play Guest in 2012. 

For almost 10 years, Ok only played minor and supporting roles in various stage plays, films, and TV dramas. In 2021, she landed her first main role in the TV series Mine which became a hit and Ok gained recognition for her villain character. For her performance, she received a Best Supporting Actress nomination at the 58th Baeksang Arts Awards. 

Ok received her first acting award at the 23rd Jeonju International Film Festival after being named Best Actress for her work in the independent film The Archeology of Love.

Filmography

Film

Television series

Television shows

Theater

Awards and nominations

References

External links 
  

 
 
 Ok Ja-yeon at PlayDB.co.kr

1988 births
Living people
People from Suncheon
South Korean television actresses
South Korean film actresses
21st-century South Korean actresses